Jordi is the Catalan form of the ancient Greek name Georgios. Jordi is a popular name in Catalonia and is also given in the Netherlands and in Spanish-, English- and German-speaking countries.

Jordi may also refer to:

Sant Jordi – patron saint of Aragon and Catalonia
La Diada de Sant Jordi – Catalan holiday held on April 23rd with similarities to Valentine's Day, traditionally men give women roses and women give men a book to celebrate the occasion.

People

Academics and business 
Jordi Canals – economist and former business school dean
Jordi Galí – macroeconomist, professor, and author
Jordi Guimet – information engineer and pioneer in geographic systems
Jordi Montana – industrial design expert and Rector of the University of Vic
Jordi Nadal – economist and historian
Jordi Ustrell Aguilà – computer engineer and pioneer of Internet banking

Activism 

 Jordi Casamitjana

Art and media 
Jordi Bernet – Spanish comics artist who used Jordi as a pseudonym in the 60s and 70s
Jordi Bonet – Catalan-born Canadian painter, ceramist, muralist, and sculptor
Jordi Caballero – movie and television actor, dancer, choreographer and producer
Jordi Davieson – lead vocals and guitar for Australian four-piece indie pop band San Cisco
Jordi Galceran – Catalan playwright and author
Jordi James – lead singer of the British band Sugarthief
Jordi Mollà – Barcelona-born actor, filmmaker, writer, and artist
Jordi Morgan – radio and television broadcaster in Nova Scotia, Canada
Jordi El Niño Polla (born 1994), Spanish pornographic actor
Jordi Palacios, fictional character in Red Band Society (TV series)
Jordi Roca – pastry chef of the restaurant El Celler de Can Roca
Jordi Vilasuso – Cuban-American actor
Jordi Webber – member of New Zealand band Titanium
Jordi Savall – Catalan violist

Military and politics 
Jordi Cuixart –  president of Òmnium Cultural, which preserves and promotes Catalan culture
Jordi Darmstadt – Prince George Louis of Hessen-Darmstadt, Field Marshal in the Austrian army
Jordi Farragut –  United States Navy officer during the American Revolutionary War
Jordi Hereu – former mayor of Barcelona
Jordi Pujol – former president of Catalonia
Jordi Salvador (born 1964), Catalan politician
Jordi Sànchez i Picanyol – president of the Catalan National Assembly, an organization promoting Catalan independence

Sport 
Jordi Alba – Spanish/Catalan football player for FC Barcelona and the Spain national football team
Jordi Amat – Catalan professional footballer who plays for Swansea City
Jordi Bitter – Dutch footballer
Jordi Codina – professional footballer who plays for Getafe CF as a goalkeeper
Jordi Cruyff – Dutch football player and son of Johan Cruyff
Jordi Gómez – Barcelona-born professional footballer who plays for Sunderland
Jordi Figueras Montel – Spanish soccer player commonly known as Jordi
Jordi Hoogstrate – retired Dutch footballer
Jordi Masip – goalkeeper for Real Valladolid
Jordi Murphy – Barcelona-born Irish rugby player
Jordi Pasqualin – English rugby player
Jordi Roura – Spanish/Catalan former football player and current FC Barcelona academy 
Jordi Tarrés (footballer) (born 1981), Hong Kong footballer
Jordi Tarrés (motorcycle trials rider) - Spanish trials rider 
Jordi van Gelderen – Dutch professional footballer
Jordi Vanlerberghe – Belgian professional footballer
Jordi Xumetra – professional footballer who plays for Real Zaragoza

In popular culture 
Jordi (album), a 2021 album by Maroon 5
Jordi Palacios – character played by Nolan Sotillo on FOX comedy-drama Red Band Society
Jordi's Star – children's book by author Alma Flor Ada
Palau Sant Jordi – the main indoor sporting arena in Barcelona, Spain

Catalan masculine given names